Lakshmi Niwas is a Rana palace in Maharajgunj, Kathmandu, the capital of Nepal. The palace complex, located north of the Bagmati river, was incorporated in an impressive and vast array of courtyards, gardens and buildings. It was built by Chandra Shumsher JBR, at the time prime minister and the executive leader of Nepal.

History
The palace complex was built by Chandra Shumsher JBR for his son Mohan Shumsher JBR in 1905 under first engineer brothers of Nepal Kumar Narasingh Rana and Kishor Narasingh Rana. Mohan Shumsher moved to Lakshmi Nivas permanently from his fathers palace Singha durbar only after death of his father Chandra Shumsher in 1929 until 1948, when he moved back to Singha Durbar as prime minister. Later after the fall of the Rana dynasty in 1951, Mohan Shumsher left Singha Durbar for Lakshmi Niwas in 1953 after he was ordered by His Majesty's Government to leave the palace while claiming back Singha Durbar as a National Property.

Under Government of Nepal
After the fall of the Rana regime, Lakshmi Niwas was occupied and owned by Mohan Shumsher JBR but later he fled from Nepal, causing the nationalization of all his property along with Lakshmi Niwas. Currently the palace is occupied and owned by the Nepal army.

See also
Rana palaces of Nepal
Thapathali Durbar
Singha Durbar

References

Palaces in Kathmandu
Rana palaces of Nepal